Baeckea latifolia is a species of flowering plant in the family Myrtaceae and is endemic to south-eastern continental Australia. It is a shrub with broadly elliptic leaves and small white flowers with six to eight stamens.

Description 

Taxonomy
This baeckea was first formally described in 1867 by George Bentham who gave it the name Baeckea gunniana var. latifolia in Flora Australiensis from specimens collected by Ferdinand von Mueller in "Baw-Baw Mountains. In 1997, Anthony Bean raised the variety to species status as Baeckea latifolia in the journal Telopea. The specific epithet (latifolia) means "broad-leaved".

Distribution and habitat
Baeckea latifolia grows in the edges of snow gum woodlands and in grassland at altitudes above  in eastern Victoria and southern New South Wales.

References

latifolia
Flora of New South Wales
Flora of Victoria (Australia)
Plants described in 1867
Taxa named by George Bentham